Aleksey Sergeyevich Pustozyorov (born 21 September 1988) is a Russian professional football player who plays for Kaluga.

Career

Club
He played 4 seasons in the Russian Football National League for FC Lada Togliatti, FC Tyumen and FC Volgar Astrakhan.

Pustozyorov left FC Ararat-Armenia on 20 June 2019 by mutual consent. He then played for Belarusian club, FC Slutsk, for the rest of the year. In 2020, he moved to Kazakh club FC Atyrau.

References

External links
 
 

1988 births
Sportspeople from Sevastopol
Living people
Russian footballers
Russian expatriate footballers
Association football midfielders
FC Lada-Tolyatti players
FC Tyumen players
FC Zenit-Izhevsk players
FC Volgar Astrakhan players
FC Ararat-Armenia players
FC Slutsk players
FC Atyrau players
FC Belshina Bobruisk players
Russian Second League players
Russian First League players
Armenian Premier League players
Belarusian Premier League players
Russian expatriate sportspeople in Armenia
Russian expatriate sportspeople in Belarus
Russian expatriate sportspeople in Kazakhstan
Expatriate footballers in Armenia
Expatriate footballers in Belarus
Expatriate footballers in Kazakhstan